The following is a list of films produced in the Kannada film industry in India in 1988, presented in alphabetical order.

See also
Kannada films of 1987
Kannada films of 1989

References

1988
Kannada
Films, Kannada